Lycomorphodes bipartita is a moth of the family Erebidae. It was described by Francis Walker in 1866. It is found in Pará, Brazil.

References

 

Cisthenina
Moths described in 1866